The Hispanic Outlook in Higher Education is an American biweekly magazine that focuses on Hispanic education in institutions of higher learning. It is notable for its annual Top 100 list of colleges and universities awarding degrees to Hispanic students.

Published biweekly, except in June, July, and August HO covers events, news, and ongoing trends that affect our multicultural institutions of the 21st century. HO reaches a large minority audience. As of September 2008, HO started putting a selection of articles online. As of December 2011, HO started the digital format of the magazine with free Apps available on iTunes and Google Play. As of June 2013, Hispanic Outlook has kept its presence as a full color digital magazine.

HO is a member of NAHP, NAHJ, NCCHC, ACE and AAHHE.

References

External links
Official website

Magazines published in the United States
Biweekly magazines published in the United States
Education magazines
Hispanic and Latino American
Magazines established in 1990
Professional and trade magazines
Magazines published in New Jersey
1990 establishments in New Jersey